Tina Bojanowski (born August 29, 1964) is an American politician. She is a Democrat representing District 32 in the Kentucky House of Representatives.

Personal life 

Bojanowski holds a Bachelor of Science and an MBA from the University of Louisville, and a MAT and PhD from Bellarmine University. She is currently a teacher at Watterson Elementary School, a public school in Louisville, Kentucky.

Political career 

Bojanowski was elected to represent the 32nd district in the Kentucky House of Representatives in 2018. She is running for re-election in 2020.

Committee Assignments 

 Primary & Secondary Ed & Workforce Development
 Education
 State Government
 Veterans, Military Affairs, & Public Protection

Electoral record

References 

Living people
Democratic Party members of the Kentucky House of Representatives
University of Louisville alumni
Schoolteachers from Kentucky
American women educators
Bellarmine University alumni
1964 births
21st-century American politicians
21st-century American women politicians